James Learmont McBean was a Scottish amateur footballer who played as a full back in the Scottish League for Queen's Park.

Personal life 
McBean was a medical student. He served as a captain in the Royal Army Medical Corps in India during the First World War.

References

Year of birth missing
Scottish footballers
Scottish Football League players
Place of birth missing
Association football fullbacks
Queen's Park F.C. players
Date of death missing
Ayr F.C. players
Kilmarnock F.C. players
British Army personnel of World War I
Royal Army Medical Corps officers